Dogger is a children's picture book written and illustrated by Shirley Hughes, published by The Bodley Head in 1977.

Plot
It features a boy and his stuffed dog, who is lost, showing "the distress the loss of a toy causes a child". The boy's sister has an opportunity to earn Dogger back.

Publication history
Prentice-Hall published the first U.S. edition in 1978 under the title David and Dog.

Reception
'Dogger' has received positive reviews. Kirkus Reviews found that "The loss and retrieval of a favorite toy animal is agreeably handled" and "Pleasant, if unoriginal—as usual, Hughes' rumpled tots and general clutter make you feel instantly at home." while The Guardian called it "the perfect children's story - there is conflict then resolution." and BookTrust found it "heart-warming ... that will especially appeal to any youngsters who have a special favourite toy."  Zena Sutherland, writing in The Best in Children's Books. found "A touching story comes from England, but it has qualities that should make it universally appealing" and concluded "Familiar concepts, a plot nicely gauged for small children's interest and comprehension, and a credible happy ending should satisfy listeners, while the beautifully detailed paintings ... should engage both readers-aloud and their audiences."

The librarians recommend the book for "young readers" and for ages 4+.

Awards
Hughes won the 1977 Kate Greenaway Medal from the Library Association, recognising the year's best children's book illustration by a British subject. For the 50th anniversary of the Medal (1955–2005), a panel of experts named Dogger one of the top ten winning works, which composed the ballot for a public election of the nation's favourite.
Dogger won the public vote and thus it was named the all-time "Greenaway of Greenaways" on 21 June 2007.
(The public voted on the panel's shortlist of ten, selected from the 53 winning works 1955 to 2005. Hughes and Dogger polled 26% of the vote to 25% for its successor, the 1978 medalist Janet Ahlberg and Each Peach Pear Plum.)

References

Citations
 Neumark, Victoria. "Gems for the ears." Times Educational Supplement (04 Sep. 1998): VI.
 "Pullman and Hughes all-time winners." Library & Information Update 6.7/8 (July 2007): 2-2.

External links
  —immediately, first US edition 

British children's books
British picture books
Kate Greenaway Medal winning works
Fictional dolls and dummies
The Bodley Head books
1977 children's books
Books about dogs